Ivan Ljubičić was the defending champion, but did not participate.

Novak Djokovic won the title, defeating Jürgen Melzer 4–6, 6–3, 6–2 in the final.

By winning this tournament, Djokovic became ATP nr. 16, entering the Top 20 for the first time in his career.

Seeds

Draw

Finals

Top half

Bottom half

External links
Main Draw
Qualifying Draw

Open de Moselle - Singles
2006 Open de Moselle